FK Slovan Most pri Bratislave is a Slovak association football club located in Most pri Bratislave. It currently plays in 3. liga (3rd tier in Slovak football system). The club was founded in 1955.

Colors and badge

Its colors are blue and white.

Notable players
The following players had international caps for their respective countries. Players whose name is listed in bold represented their countries while playing for Slovan.
Past (and present) players who are the subjects of Wikipedia articles can be found here.
 Alias Lembakoali
 Siradji Sani

External links
Futbalnet profile 
Official club website

References

Football clubs in Slovakia
Association football clubs established in 1955
1955 establishments in Czechoslovakia